Ministry of Defence Chicksands or more simply MoD Chicksands is a UK Ministry of Defence station located 7.7 miles (12.4 km) south east of Bedford, Bedfordshire and 11.6 miles (18.7 km) north east of Luton, Bedfordshire.  Now the location of the Defence Intelligence and Security Centre (DISC), it was previously named RAF Chicksands.

It closed in 1997 when responsibility for the camp was taken over by the British Army Intelligence Corps. Near the town of Shefford it is named after Chicksands Priory, a 12th-century Gilbertine monastery located within the perimeter of the camp.

Site history

The Crown Commissioners bought the Chicksands estate on 15 April 1936, later renting it to Gerald Bagshawe, who lived there until it was requisitioned by the Royal Navy. After nine months the RAF took over operations and established a signal intelligence collection (SIGINT) unit there, known as a Y Station.

The site operated as a SIGINT collection site throughout the Second World War, intercepting German traffic and passing the resulting material to the Government Code and Cypher School at Bletchley Park.

United States Air Force Europe

In 1950 the site was subleased to the United States Air Force serving as the base of the 6940th Radio Squadron, responsible for continued communications and SIGINT operation through the Cold War. The RAF continued to act as a host unit for the resident USAF units, including over time the 6950th United States Air Force Security Squadron, later becoming the 6950th Electronic Security Group and the 7274th Air Base Group.

In 1962, a  diameter AN/FLR-9 Wullenweber antenna array was constructed at Chicksands to form part of the Iron Horse HF direction finding network. This antenna array, dubbed the Elephant Cage, was dismantled in 1996 when the USAF withdrew from the site, handing it back to the British Armed Forces.

Return to British Armed Forces control

In 1997 the Intelligence Corps assumed responsibility for the site, moving the Corps Headquarters from Ashford, Kent along with Intelligence Training.

Current use

Since 1997 the site has been the home of the Defence Intelligence and Security Centre (DISC) and the Headquarters of the Intelligence Corps. In January 2015, the site became home to the Joint Intelligence Training Group (JITG).

JITG conducts training for personnel of all three arms of the British Armed Forces, members of the Civil Service and others. Courses are delivered across the range of Intelligence disciplines.

 is a Royal Naval Reserve training centre formed in 1989 at the Intelligence Corps centre in Ashford. The unit transferred with the Corps and the Defence Intelligence and Security Centre in 1997.

See also

 List of former Royal Air Force stations
 United States Air Forces in Europe
 United States Air Force in the United Kingdom

References

External links
 Friends of Chicksands Priory
 RAF Chicksands, England - USAF Message Board
 Chicksands Offices - Mid Beds District Council
 Thunderbolt A-10 Down - Airshow crash

Military installations closed in 1997
Royal Air Force stations in Bedfordshire
Royal Air Force stations of World War II in the United Kingdom
Tourist attractions in Bedfordshire
1936 establishments in the United Kingdom
1997 disestablishments in England
Y service